Allan Campbell (born 4 July 1998) is a Scottish footballer who plays as a midfielder for Luton Town. He has previously played for Motherwell, was selected 24 times for the Scotland under-21 team and made his full international debut for Scotland in June 2022.

Club career
Campbell was born in Glasgow and attended All Saints Roman Catholic Secondary School in the city. He is a product of the Motherwell Academy having joined the club at the age of 10.

On 29 October 2016, Campbell made his debut for Motherwell as a substitute in a 4–1 win against Ross County. On 15 April 2017, he scored his first senior goal, the fourth in a 4–2 win over Inverness Caledonian Thistle, picking up the man of the match award at the same time.

On 13 October 2017, Campbell signed a new contract, keeping him at Motherwell until 2021. His contract was later improved, but not extended. During the 2017–18 season he took part in the 2017 Scottish League Cup Final (as a substitute) and the 2018 Scottish Cup Final (as a starter), both occasions ending in 2–0 losses to Celtic.

On 12 September 2020, he scored the only goal of a Scottish Premiership match against St Johnstone. In May 2021 the Motherwell manager Graham Alexander said that Campbell would leave the club at the end of the season, as a final effort to negotiate a new contract had failed.

On 15 June 2021, Luton Town announced the signing of Campbell after agreeing an undisclosed fee with Motherwell to secure his signature before his contract expired.

International career
In September 2017, Campbell was named in the Scotland under-21 squad for the first time ahead of the European Under-21 Championship qualifying matches against England and Latvia. He made his debut on 6 October 2017, against England. Campbell scored one goal for the Scotland under-21 team, in a 1–0 win against Lithuania in September 2020.

Selected for the Scotland under-21 squad in the 2018 Toulon Tournament, the team lost to Turkey in a penalty-out and finished fourth.

On 28 May 2022, Campbell received his first call-up to the senior national team as a replacement for the injured Ryan Jack. Campbell made his full international debut on 14 June 2022, appearing as a substitute in a 4–1 win against Armenia.

Career statistics

References

External links
 Allan Campbell profile at Motherwell FC official website
 

1998 births
Living people
Scottish footballers
Footballers from Glasgow
People educated at All Saints Roman Catholic Secondary School
People from Springburn
Association football midfielders
Motherwell F.C. players
Luton Town F.C. players
Scottish Professional Football League players
English Football League players
Scotland under-21 international footballers
Scotland international footballers